Octodontotherium is an extinct genus of ground sloth of the family Mylodontidae, endemic to South America during the Late Oligocene (Deseadan).

Fossil distribution is exclusive to Santa Cruz Province, Argentina (Deseado and Sarmiento Formations) and Bolivia (Salla Formation).

Taxonomy 
Octodontotherium was named by Ameghino (1894). It was assigned to Mylodontidae by Carroll (1988); and to Mylodontinae by Gaudin (1995).

References 

Prehistoric sloths
Oligocene genus first appearances
Oligocene genus extinctions
Oligocene mammals of South America
Deseadan
Paleogene Argentina
Fossils of Argentina
Paleogene Bolivia
Fossils of Bolivia
Fossil taxa described in 1894
Taxa named by Florentino Ameghino
Golfo San Jorge Basin
Sarmiento Formation